M. esculenta  may refer to:
 Manihot esculenta, the cassava, yuca or manioc, a shrub species found in South America
 Morchella esculenta, the morel, yellow morel, common morel, true morel, morel mushroom or sponge morel, a mushroom species

Synonyms
 Moronobea esculenta, a synonym for Platonia insignis, a tree species found in South America

See also
 List of Latin and Greek words commonly used in systematic names#E